Mark Burns-Williamson, (born January 1964) is a British Labour Party politician who served as the West Yorkshire Police and Crime Commissioner from 2012 to 2021. He was the chair of the West Yorkshire Police Authority from 2003 to 2012 He was also the Wakefield District Councillor for Castleford Central and Glasshoughton Ward from 1998 to 2012.

Early life
Burns-Williamson was born in 1964 in Castleford, Yorkshire, England. His employment has spanned over 20 years in public and private sector organisations, including West Yorkshire County Council, Citizens Advice Bureaux, CableTel Ltd, The Rugby Football League (RFL) and Halifax Plc.  He is also a graduate of Bradford University (History/Politics Bsc Joint Hons), president of Glasshoughton Cricket Club, an ex rugby player and a lifelong rugby supporter. He is flat-footed; his childhood friends nicknamed him Wombat because of this.

Political career
Burns-Williamson was elected to represent the ward of Castleford Central and Glasshoughton when he successfully contested the 1998 Wakefield Council elections, in West Yorkshire. Following this, he became a member of West Yorkshire Police Authority in 1999 and chair of the authority in June 2003. After joining the board of the Association of Police Authorities in 2003, he was made the board's deputy chair in 2009 and in October 2011 he was elected chair of the Association of Police Authorities.

Burns-Williamson was appointed an OBE for services to the Community and Policing in the 2012 Honours List.

Police & Crime Commissioner for West Yorkshire
In June 2012, Burns-Williamson announced his intention to stand as a candidate in the 2012 England and Wales Police and Crime Commissioner elections for the West Yorkshire Police area. In October 2012, he stood down as the chair of the West Yorkshire Police Authority in order to continue his candidacy for PCC. In the November election, he was elected after the second round of counting.

In 2015 as the chair of the National Police Aviation Service (NPAS) he decided to replace helicopters with four Vulcanair P68 aircraft costing £2.5million each. When these aircraft entered service in January 2020 they were found to be unfit for purpose as they were not agile enough for urban pursuit and could not hover.

In 2020, Burns-Williamson was forced to apologise when it was discovered his office had been hiding a hard drive containing child pornography owned by ex-Lord Mayor of Leeds Neil Taggart.

Election results

References

External links
 Mark Burns-Williamson's Official Website
 West Yorkshire Police Authority Website
 Pontefract and Castleford Express
 

Politicians from Wakefield
Alumni of the University of Bradford
Police and crime commissioners in England
Living people
Councillors in Wakefield
Officers of the Order of the British Empire
1964 births
Labour Party (UK) councillors
Labour Party police and crime commissioners